Egyptian athletes have won Track and Field medals in African, Pan Arab Games and international athletic events. Most of the gold medals in African or international event were won in the throwing events.

In the 1970s and 1980s Nagui Asaad, Hassan Ahmed Hamad, Hisham Greiss, Mohamed Naguib Hamed, Ahmed Kamel Shata and Ahmed Mohamed Ashoush formed one of the strongest Egyptian teams in the throwing events. 

Nagui Asaad (1971 Mediterranean Games shot put) and Abdel Herin (1955 Mediterranean Games marathon) are the only Egyptian athletes (Track and field) to win a gold medal in the Mediterranean Gamess.

In the 1990s Hanan Ahmed Khaled won many gold medals in discus throw and shot put. 

More recently a new generation of Egyptian athletes supervised by Nagui Asaad—like Yasser Ibrahim Farag and Omar Ahmed El Ghazaly—won a lot of medals in throw events at the African competitions.

Shot put

Nagui Asaad
Ahmed Mohamed Ashoush
Hanan Ahmed Khaled
Yasser Ibrahim Farag
Wafa Ismail El Baghdadi
Omar Ahmed El Ghazaly
Shebel Hassan Farag
Gouda Attia

Discus throw
Mohamed Naguib Hamed
Hassan Ahmed Hamad
Nagui Asaad
Hanan Ahmed Khaled

Hammer throw
Hisham Greiss 
Marwa Ahmed Hussein
Mohsen El Anany

Long jump
 Hatem Mersal
Ezzedin Yacoub Hamed

100 metres
Emad El Shafei

400 metres
Amin Gomaa Badawi
Farouk Tadros
Mohamed El Sayed

800 metres
Mohamed Abdel Rahman

1500 metres
William Fahmi

See also
List of Egyptians
African Championships in Athletics
Mediterranean Games
All Africa Games
Pan Arab Games

References

External links
 African Championships in Athletics results on gbrathletics website http://www.gbrathletics.com/ic/afc.htm 
Mediterranean Games Athletic results  gbrathletics website http://www.gbrathletics.com/ic/mg.htm
All Africa Games Athletics results gbrathletics website http://www.gbrathletics.com/ic/afg.htm
Pan Arab Games results gbrathletics website http://www.gbrathletics.com/ic/arg.htm
gbrathletics Egyptian athletics championships winners since 1981 external link

Egyptian

Egyptian